Antoine Helha (born November 19, 1982 in Douala) is a Cameroonian footballer currently playing as a striker for Cerrito in the Uruguayan Primera División.

Teams
  Fovu Baham 2002-2005
  Plaza Colonia 2005
  Bella Vista 2006
  Boston River 2007
  El Tanque Sisley 2008-2009
  Coquimbo Unido 2009
  El Tanque Sisley 2010-2011
  Cerrito 2011–present

References
 Profile at BDFA 
 
 

1982 births
Living people
Cameroonian footballers
Cameroonian expatriate footballers
Cameroon international footballers
Plaza Colonia players
Sportivo Cerrito players
Boston River players
El Tanque Sisley players
C.A. Bella Vista players
Coquimbo Unido footballers
Expatriate footballers in Chile
Expatriate footballers in Uruguay
Cameroonian expatriate sportspeople in Chile
Cameroonian expatriate sportspeople in Uruguay
Association football forwards